The 1922 Winslow Junction train derailment was a July 2, 1922 accident on Atlantic City Railroad's Camden to Atlantic City route.

Accident
On Atlantic City Railroad's Camden to Atlantic City Line, in Winslow, New Jersey: at Winslow Junction near the WA Tower, On July 2, 1922, shortly before 11:30pm, a derailment of train № 33 the Owl, with Philadelphia and Reading Railway Eng № 349. The derailment of train № 33 resulted in most of the six-car Atlantic City express plunging down an embankment into the WJ&S's southbound Cape May branch connecting track. This resulted in the death of 3 passengers, 3 employees and 1 Pullman porter, and the injury of 84 passengers and 5 employees.

Investigation
The Interstate Commerce Commission investigation found that the route could have been changed after the train had passed the distant signal at the plant was not interlocked, but there was not evidence that this had been done. The report further stated that the engineer failed to acknowledge the junction by blowing the whistle and attempt to stop the train.

From the ICC report
"This accident was caused by failure of Engineman Wescott of train № 33 to be governed by automatic and interlocking signal indications, which resulted in train № 33 taking the diverging route at a high rate of speed and being derailed due to the outer rail of the curve giving way."

See also
Atlantic City Railroad
Reading Company
Pennsylvania–Reading Seashore Lines

References

Bibliography

External links
Eight Killed in Midnight Wreck in New Jersey (The Deseret News, 3 Jul 1922, page 1)
Many Killed and Injured in Big Wreck (Madera Tribune, 3 Jul 1922, page 1)
Nine Meet Death, 32 Injured, In Wreck of Jersey Flyer (Franklin News-Herald, 3 Jul 1922, page 1)
Theodore M Selden (African-Americans at Dartmouth College)

Railway accidents and incidents in New Jersey
Accidents and incidents involving Atlantic City Railroad
Pennsylvania-Reading Seashore Lines
Railway accidents in 1922
1922 in New Jersey
Winslow Township, New Jersey
Derailments in the United States
July 1922 events